A Parmesan knife or grana knife (Italian: tagliagrana) is a knife with a drop-shaped blade and a round wooden handle used to break hard cheeses like grana or parmigiano into shards. Bigger knives with a flat handle that can be hammered are used to cut open the cheese wheels, the crusts of which are rather hard.

It is depicted in the official logo of PDO parmigiano reggiano.

References 

Kitchen knives